Povilionis is a Lithuanian surname. Notable people with the surname include:
Vidmantas Povilionis (born 1948), Lithuanian politician and diplomat
 (born 1946), Lithuanian folk musician and singer 

Lithuanian-language surnames